Phil Simon (born ca. 1972) is an American speaker, professor, and author. He writes about management, technology, disruption, communication, and analytics.

Education 
Simon studied economics and political science at Carnegie Mellon University, receiving his BS in Policy and Management in 1993. He studied labor relations at Cornell University and obtained his MILR in 1997.

Work 
Simon started his career as human-resource consultant in 1997 at Capital One for a year, and at Merck & Co. for two years. After two more years as an application consultant for Lawson Software, he started his own consulting firm.

He has written thirteen books, including Reimagining Collaboration: Slack, Microsoft Teams, Zoom, and the Post-COVID World of Work, Analytics: The Agile Way and Slack For Dummies. He also contributed to the 2020 book Agile: The Insights You Need from Harvard Business Review (HBR Insights Series), along with Scrum co-creator Jeff Sutherland. 

In May 2016, Simon accepted a position as a full-time faculty member at the W. P. Carey School of Business at Arizona State University. He left ASU in May 2020. 

His work has appeared in Fast Company, the New York Times, CNN, Inc. Magazine, Harvard Business Review The Huffington Post, and many other sites.

Awards 
In February 2016, Simon received a 2015 Axiom award for Message Not Received: Why Business Communication Is Broken and How to Fix It  in the category of networking / communication. In 2012, he received a 2011 Axiom best business technology book award for The Age of the Platform: How Amazon, Apple, Facebook, and Google Have Redefined Business.

Simon announced in April 2012 that The Age of the Platform: How Amazon, Apple, Facebook, and Google Have Redefined Business would be translated into Korean in late 2012.

Views 
Simon believes that the platform represents a fundamentally new business model—the most important one of the 21st century.  Specifically, APIs and SDKs are enabling developers to build mobile apps and web services faster and on a much greater scale than ever. The most successful companies of the day—e.g., Amazon.com, Apple Inc., Facebook, and Google—no longer focus on one line of business. Rather, they quickly and frequently add adjacent offerings, products, and services—i.e., planks.

Through increasingly powerful ecosystems, companies today are externalizing a great deal of their innovation. What's more, they are evolving at increasingly rapid speeds. Emerging platforms such as Twitter, Kickstarter, Force.com, WordPress, Udemy, and scores of others are redefining business in tectonic ways that we have only begun to understand.

In recent years, research by Marshall Van Alstyne, Scott Galloway (professor), and others has confirmed the power of platforms—and, specifically, Amazon, Apple, Facebook, and Google.

Selected publications

References

External links 
 

1970s births
Living people
Writers from Las Vegas
American technology writers
American male bloggers
American bloggers
Carnegie Mellon University alumni
Cornell University alumni
21st-century American non-fiction writers